Mount Adams Public School is a registered historic building in Cincinnati, Ohio, listed in the National Register on November 24, 1980.

It was the first home of the School for Creative and Performing Arts from 1973 to 1975.

Notes 

National Register of Historic Places in Cincinnati
School buildings on the National Register of Historic Places in Ohio